A special election was held in  on August 30, 1808 to fill a vacancy resulting from the death of Nehemiah Knight (DR) on June 13, 1808.  This election was held at the same time as the 1808 elections.

Election results

Jackson took his seat on November 11, 1808.  Jackson also won election to the 11th Congress at the same time.

See also
List of special elections to the United States House of Representatives

References

Rhode Island 1808 at-large
Rhode Island 1808 at-large
1808
Rhode Island
United States House of Representatives at-large
United States House of Representatives 1808 at-large